A reservoir is an artificial lake.

Reservoir may also refer to:

Arts and entertainment
 Reservoir (Fanfarlo album), 2009
 Reservoir (Gordi album), 2017 
 Reservoir (EP), by Fionn Regan, 2003
 Reservoir (Rauschenberg), a 1961 painting by Robert Rauschenberg

Business
 Reservoir Media, a U.S. music rights company
 Reservoir Records, a U.S. record label

Places
 Reservoir, Victoria, Australia, a suburb of Melbourne
 Reservoir, Western Australia, Australia, a suburb of Perth
 Reservoir station (MBTA), Boston, Massachusetts, US, a light-rail stop
 Reservoir, Pennsylvania, a census-designated place
 Reservoir, Providence, Rhode Island, US, a neighborhood

Science and technology
 Natural reservoir, an alternative or passive host for a disease
 Fomite, any inanimate object or substance capable of carrying infectious organisms
 Petroleum reservoir, a subsurface pool of hydrocarbons
 Ommaya reservoir, a neurosurgical catheter
 Thermal reservoir, an effectively infinite pool of thermal energy at a given, constant temperature
 Thermodynamic reservoir, a type of thermodynamic instrument

See also